Bearcreek Township is one of twelve townships in Jay County, Indiana, United States. As of the 2010 census, its population was 1,578 and it contained 472 housing units.

History
Bearcreek Township was organized in 1836.

Geography
The streams of Deer Creek and Tri Run run through this township.

Cities and towns
 Bryant

Unincorporated towns
 Antiville
 Bloomfield
 Pleasant Ridge
 Westchester

Adjacent townships
 Wabash Township, Adams County (north)
 Jefferson Township, Adams County (northeast)
 Wabash Township (east)
 Noble Township (southeast)
 Wayne Township (south)
 Jackson Township (west)
 Hartford Township, Adams County (northwest)

Cemeteries
The township contains three cemeteries: Borris, Old Baptist and Pingrey.

Major highways

References
 
 United States Census Bureau cartographic boundary files

External links
 Indiana Township Association
 United Township Association of Indiana

Townships in Jay County, Indiana
Townships in Indiana